Monte di Pietà, also called Seralcadi, Seralcadio, or il Capo, is one of the original quarters of Palermo, region of Sicily, Italy.

The four original districts or mandamenti were established during the Spanish rule of Palermo. Seralcadi derived from the arabic name Sari al Cadì encompasses the Palermo Cathedral and the mercato il Capo. The quarter has as a patron Santa Ninfa and its coat of arms depicts Hercules slaying the lion.

History of Palermo
Tourist attractions in Palermo
Zones of Palermo